The 2021 Kyrgyz Premier League was the 30th season of the Kyrgyzstan League, Kyrgyzstan's top division of association football organized by the Football Federation of Kyrgyz Republic. The season started on 16 March 2021, with eight teams participating, and ended on 6 November 2021.

Teams

Team overview

''Note: Table lists in alphabetical order.

Personnel and kits

Note: Flags indicate national team as has been defined under FIFA eligibility rules. Players and Managers may hold more than one non-FIFA nationality.

Foreign players
The number of foreign players is restricted to five per Kyrgyz Premier League team. A team can use only five foreign players on the field in each game.

League table
</onlyinclude>

Results

Round 1–14

Round 15–28

By match played

Top scorers

Awards

Monthly awards

References

External links

Kyrgyzstan League seasons
1
Kyrgyzstan